Amarte Es un Placer may refer to:

Amarte Es un Placer (album), a 1999 album by Luis Miguel
"Amarte Es un Placer" (song), the album's title track
Amarte Es Un Placer Tour, a concert tour